"Investigations of a Dog" (German: "Forschungen eines Hundes") is a short story by Franz Kafka written in 1922. It was published posthumously in Beim Bau der Chinesischen Mauer (Berlin, 1931). The first English translation by Willa and Edwin Muir was published by Martin Secker in London in 1933. It appeared in The Great Wall of China. Stories and Reflections (New York City: Schocken Books, 1946). Told from the perspective of a dog, the story concerns the nature and limits of knowledge, by way of the dog's inquiries into the practices of his culture. 

"Investigations of a Dog" was written in September and October 1922, soon after Kafka ended work on his unfinished novel The Castle. Similar to other Kafka stories such as "A Report to an Academy", "Josephine the Singer", and "The Burrow", the protagonist is an animal.

Plot
The unnamed narrator, a dog, recounts a number of episodes from its past, in which it used quasi-scientific and rational methods to resolve basic questions of its existence that most of its peers were content to leave unanswered, such as: "Whence does the Earth procure its food?".

Many of the seemingly absurd descriptions employed by the narrator express its misapprehension or confusion about the world, centering on dogkind's apparent inability to realize (or, some passages suggest, unwillingness to acknowledge) the existence of their human masters: the narrator is shocked into scientific investigation by witnessing seven dogs standing on their hind legs and performing to music (a troupe of circus or performing animals), and spends much time investigating "soaring dogs", tiny dogs lacking legs who silently exist above the heads of normal dogs while sometimes constantly talking nonsense (a reference to His Master's Voice and gramophones of human voices; cf His Master's Voice), and what actions or rituals summon forth food.

References

1922 short stories
Dogs in literature
Short stories by Franz Kafka
Short stories published posthumously